Ismail Bin Abu (born 8 April 1984) is a Malaysian field hockey player.  He was the forward of Malaysia hockey team and Terengganu Hockey Team player in Malaysia.

He made his international debut in a four-nation tournament in Australia in 2002 and last donned national colours in the Champions Challenge II tournament in Dublin for indiscipline.

Under Paul Revington, he was called back into action after being axed previously.

References 

1984 births
Living people
Malaysian male field hockey players
People from Pahang
Malaysian people of Malay descent
Commonwealth Games bronze medallists for Malaysia
Commonwealth Games medallists in field hockey
Field hockey players at the 2006 Commonwealth Games
2014 Men's Hockey World Cup players
Medallists at the 2006 Commonwealth Games